The e-memorandum was a controversial set of statements released on the website of the General Staff of the Turkish Armed Forces in April 2007 that weighed in on the Turkish presidential elections in 2007. The way the statements were written caused concerns that the Turkish military would intervene in the election against leading candidate Abdullah Gül in defence of secularism. Turkey's presidential office is regarded as the guardian of the country's secular system; the fact that Gül's wife wore an Islamic headscarf, as well as Gül's own history in political Islam, turned the elections into a political crisis.

Statement
During the crisis, on 27 April 2007, statements were published on Turkish Armed Forces official website regarding the Turkish presidential elections. One statement read:

The e-memorandum term was coined by Ural Akbulut to describe the General Staff statement because it was published exclusively online.

Response from the 59th Government
In response to these statements, government spokesman Cemil Çiçek made a speech. He said that the 59th government was sensitive about the secular, democratic, social, and lawful state. Çiçek added that the statements by the Army were considered as against the 59th government.

International reaction to the e-memorandum
 – The European Union has warned Turkey's military not to interfere in politics. EU Enlargement Commissioner Olli Rehn said:
"This is a clear test case whether the Turkish armed forces respect democratic secularization and democratic values... The timing is rather surprising and strange. It's important that the military respects also the rules of the democratic game and its own role in that democratic game."

 – The U.S. was also interested in this issue. Dan Fried, assistant secretary of state for European and Eurasian affairs, said: "We don't take sides." However, while answering a question that whether US supported EU's approach Secretary of State Condoleezza Rice said: "The United States fully supports Turkish democracy and its constitutional processes, and that means that the election, the electoral system... have to be upheld. Yes. The answer is yes, the U.S. would be in a similar position", supporting EU's approach.

Aftermath
Abdullah Gül was not elected as the President on the first voting, since the election was almost entirely boycotted by opposition MPs, and a general election was called. In the elections, AKP gained 341 seats and the Nationalist Movement Party (MHP) gained 71 seats. Since MHP did not boycott the election, at least 367 members were present, and Abdullah Gül was elected as the President with AKP's support.

Yaşar Büyükanıt, then Chief of the Turkish General Staff, said that it was him who had written the statement, but he denied that it was a memorandum.

Kemal Kılıçdaroğlu, the leader of the opposition party CHP since 2010, has said that CHP would file a criminal complaint against Büyükanıt for his alleged involvement of the military in democratic elections.

See also
 1997 military memorandum (Turkey)
 Coup diary
 2007 Turkish presidential election

References

2007 in Turkey
Politics of Turkey
2007 in Turkish politics
Alleged coup attempts in Turkey